Universal Love – Wedding Songs Reimagined is a 2018 album of same-sex wedding songs by various artists, promoted by MGM Resorts.  It features wedding songs with gender-specific terms adjusted to refer to the same gender as the singer.

On 9 April 2018, Kesha released her song from the album, "I Need a Woman to Love" (a reworking of "I Need a Man to Love", originally sung by Janis Joplin on the album Cheap Thrills) with a video featuring Kesha officiating at a same-sex wedding. The music video won Best Editing at the 2019 Webby Awards.

Track listing

References 

2018 compilation albums
Covers albums
LGBT-related albums
Legacy Recordings compilation albums